The European International School Manila is a private school in Parañaque, Philippines. It is a joint venture of the German European School Manila and the Lycée Français de Manille. Its abbreviation is EIS. Another name is "Eurocampus", the location of the school in Parañaque.

History
Eurocampus was established in 1992. The British School Manila and the Dutch School Manila was also located on the so called Eurocampus, which was officially opened on October 3, 1992 by German Foreign Minister Klaus Kinkel, and his French colleague Georges Kiejman in the presence of Amelita Ramos and Armand Fabella.  Manila was the first Eurocampus world-wide.

1997 the Joint School Conference (JSC) was created, a body to discuss Eurocampus-internal pedagogical questions or projects of the schools. The delegates of each school were the headmaster, one delegate of the school board, two teachers and one student. headmasters, and representatives of students and teachers, working on projects of cooperation.

In 2004, the European International School was conceptualized and therefore, the Eurocampus was renamed as EIS Eurocampus.

In its Mission statement, Eurocampus "promotes cultural awareness in the spirit of intercultural learning and understanding by embracing all professional, educational and human aspects of cooperation."

German European School Manila
The German European School Manila is a German international school. It was first established as Jose-Rizal Schule in 1983. Renamed in 1992, as German School Manila., when the Eurocampus was formed. In 2010, the DSM renamed to its present name, after having established an international section in 2006.

French School of Manila
The Lycée Français de Manille, is an embassy school.

Location
It is located at 75 Swaziland St., Better Living Subd., Parañaque, Philippines. The nearest landmark includes SM Bicutan.

Facilities
Both GESM and LFM share most of the facilities of the EIS like the football field, gym, swimming pool, library, and clinic.

Accreditation
It has an International Baccalaureate Diploma Programme. The GESM is recognized by the German Embassy and German International Schools Abroad. The LFM is recognized by the French Embassy and Agency for French Education abroad.

See also
Deutsche Europäische Schule Manila
Lycée Français de Manille

External links/References
German European School Manila
Lycée Français de Manille
European International School

International schools in Metro Manila
Schools in Parañaque